Fremersberg Tower (German: Fremersbergturm) is an  telecommunication tower built of reinforced concrete with an observation deck 30 metres above ground. There is a small restaurant located next to the tower. 
Fremersberg Tower, which was built in 1961 is situated on  Fremersberg near Baden-Baden at  8°12'8" E and 48°45'10" N.

See also 
 List of towers

External links 

 http://skyscraperpage.com/diagrams/?b47375
 

Buildings and structures in Baden-Baden
Bismarck towers
Tourist attractions in Baden-Württemberg